Subhashree Ganguly (born 3 November 1990) is an Indian actress, model and the winner of Anandalok Nayikar Khonje 2006. She is the highest paid actress of Bengali cinema.

She made her acting debut in 2008 with the Odia comedy drama film Mate Ta Love Helare and subsequently made her debut in Bengali films with Pitribhumi, in which she played a supporting role. Her first starring role in a Bengali film Bajimaat.  After this she had Bengali films like Challenge, Paran Jai Jaliya Re(2009), Romeo, Khokababu (2012), Khoka 420 (2013), Boss, Game, Ami Shudhu Cheyechi Tomay (2014), Abhimaan, Boss 2: Back to Rule (2017), Nabab (2017), Chalbaaz (2018), Parineeta (2019).

Early life and background 

Subhashree Ganguly was born on 3 November 1989 at Bardhaman, West Bengal, India to Bina and Debaprasd Ganguly. Her mother Bina Ganguly is a house wife and her father Debaprasad Ganguly was a school clerk.  She studied at Burdawan Municipal Girl's.

In 2006 she joined the television reality show Anandalok Nayikar Khonje and became the winner. After that she started her career as a model then she made her debut in film industry by an Oriya-film Mate Ta Love Helare in 2008, which was directed by Ashok Pati subsequently she made her debut in Bengali films with Pitribhumi, in which she played a supporting role.

Personal life 

In the year 2016 when Ganguly was filming Abhimaan, she had a relationship with the director of the film Raj Chakraborty. On 6 March 2018 they got engaged at Kolkata and were married on 11 May, at Bawali Rajbari. On 12 September 2020 she gave birth to a baby boy.

Career 

After winning Anandalok Nayikar Khonje in 2006, Subhashree made her debut in Oriya films with Mate Ta Love Helare. Subsequently, she made her debut in Bengali films with Pitribhumi, in which she played a supporting role.

She rose to prominence after working with Bengali film actor Dev in films such as Challenge, Khokababu, Khoka 420, Romeo, Paran Jai Jaliya Re  and the unreleased Dhumketu . Khoka 420 and Paran Jai Jaliya Re are ranked among the highest grossing Bengali movies.

Her pairing with another Bengali actor Jeet has been equally successful with films like Boss, Game, Abhimaan and Boss 2: Back to Rule. Boss 2: Back to Rule has been ranked among the biggest hits in the history of Bengali cinema.

She paired up with Shakib Khan in the films Nabab and Chalbaaz. Nabab is ranked among the highest grossing Bangladeshi movies.

In 2019, film Parineeta marked a significant change in her career. Her portrayal of mehul brought her appreciation from critics and she won multiple awards for best actress, including Best Actor In A Leading Role (Female) in Filmfare Awards Bangla.

Television

Mahalaya

Filmography

Films

Web series

Awards and nominations

References

External links 

Actresses from Kolkata
Living people
Actresses in Bengali cinema
Indian film actresses
21st-century Indian actresses
Actresses in Tamil cinema
People from Bardhaman
1989 births